The 1950–51 Detroit Red Wings season was the Red Wings' 25th season.

Offseason

Regular season

Final standings

Record vs. opponents

Schedule and results

Playoffs

Player statistics

Regular season
Scoring

Goaltending

Playoffs
Scoring

Goaltending

Note: GP = Games played; G = Goals; A = Assists; Pts = Points; +/- = Plus-minus PIM = Penalty minutes; PPG = Power-play goals; SHG = Short-handed goals; GWG = Game-winning goals;
      MIN = Minutes played; W = Wins; L = Losses; T = Ties; GA = Goals against; GAA = Goals-against average;  SO = Shutouts;

Awards and records

Transactions

See also
1950–51 NHL season

References

External links

Detroit Red Wings season, 1950-51
Detroit Red Wings season, 1950-51
Detroit Red Wings seasons
Detroit Red Wings
Detroit Red Wings